Podoviridae is a family of  bacteriophage in the order Caudovirales often associated with T-7 like phages. There are 130 species in this family, assigned to 3 subfamilies and 52 genera. This family is characterized by having very short, noncontractile tails. Podoviradae are largely understudied and most new isolates are of the phicbkviruses genus, a group of giant viruses that appear to be Caulobacter specific.

Structure

Viruses in Podoviridae are non-enveloped, with icosahedral and head-tail geometries. The diameter is around 60 nm, and consists of 72 capsomers. The head protein has a molecular mass of ~38 kiloDaltons and is present in 460 copies per virion. There are 9 structural proteins. The tail is non-contractile and has 6 short subterminal fibers. It is thick and rod-shaped and built of stacked disks. The maximum length is ~17 nm.

The double stranded DNA genome is linear, around 40-42kb in length, and encodes ~55 genes. The guanine + cytosine content is ~50%. It has terminally redundant sequences and is nonpermuted. By weight, the genome constitutes ~50% of the viron. The genome encodes 9 structural proteins, an adenylated transferase B type DNA polymerase and an RNA polymerase. Three internal proteins constitute the polymerase complex. Two classes of genes are recognized (early and late). This classification is based on the timing of transcription that is temporally regulated. Genes with related functions are clustered together. Genome replication is bidirectional.

Life cycle
Viral replication is cytoplasmic. Entry into the host cell is achieved by adsorption into the host cell. Replication follows the DNA strand displacement model. DNA-templated transcription is the method of transcription. The virus exits the host cell by lysis, and holin/endolysin/spanin proteins. Bacteria serve as the natural host. Transmission routes are passive diffusion. Phage infection is considered self-dosing thus self-limiting. After host lysis, new phages trigger a new infection cycle with surrounding bioavailable host species resulting in growth and expansion.

Taxonomy
Genera within this family have ~40% identity between corresponding proteins. Subfamilies have ~20% identity between corresponding proteins.

The following subfamilies and their genera are recognized (-virinae denotes subfamily and -virus denotes genus):
 Beephvirinae
 Flowerpowervirus
 Immanueltrevirus
 Manuelvirus
 Eekayvirinae
 Akonivirus
 Tinytimothyvirus
 Sepvirinae
 Diegovirus
 Oslovirus
 Traversvirus

The following genera are not assigned to a subfamily:

 Anjalivirus
 Astrithrvirus
 Badaztecvirus
 Bjornvirus
 Bruynoghevirus
 Burrovirus
 Chopinvirus
 Cimandefvirus
 Delislevirus
 Dybvigvirus
 Enhodamvirus
 Enquatrovirus
 Fipvunavirus
 Firingavirus
 Gervaisevirus
 Giessenvirus
 Hollowayvirus
 Jasminevirus
 Kafunavirus
 Kelquatrovirus
 Kochitakasuvirus
 Kozyakovvirus
 Krylovvirus
 Kuravirus
 Lahexavirus
 Lastavirus
 Lederbergvirus
 Lessievirus
 Lightbulbvirus
 Myxoctovirus
 Pagevirus
 Parlovirus
 Perisivirus
 Privateervirus
 Rauchvirus
 Ryyoungvirus
 Schmidvirus
 Sendosyvirus
 Skarprettervirus
 Sortsnevirus
 Uetakevirus
 Vicosavirus
 Wumpquatrovirus
 Wumptrevirus
 Xuquatrovirus

Lastly, the species Pseudomonas virus 119X is unassigned to a genus or subfamily.

References

External links

 Viralzone: Podoviridae
 ICTV
 Complete Genomes of Podoviridae

 
Virus families